The 1998 du Maurier Open was a tennis tournament played on outdoor hard courts. It was the 109th edition of the Canada Masters and was part of the Super 9 of the 1998 ATP Tour and of Tier I of the 1998 WTA Tour. The men's event took place at the National Tennis Centre in Toronto in Canada from August 3 through August 10, 1998, while the women's event took place at the du Maurier Stadium in Montreal in Canada from August 17 through August 23, 1998.

Finals

Men's singles

 Patrick Rafter defeated  Richard Krajicek 7–6(7–3), 6–4 
 It was Rafter's 4th title of the year and the 11th of his career. It was his 1st career Masters title.

Women's singles

 Monica Seles defeated  Arantxa Sánchez-Vicario 6–3, 6–2 
 It was Seles' 1st title of the year and the 47th of her career. It was her 1st Tier I title of the year and her 8th overall.

Men's doubles

 Martin Damm /  Jim Grabb defeated  Ellis Ferreira /  Rick Leach 6–7, 6–2, 7–6
 It was Damm's 3rd title of the year and the 14th of his career. It was Grabb's 3rd title of the year and the 25th of his career.

Women's doubles

 Martina Hingis /  Jana Novotná defeated  Yayuk Basuki /  Caroline Vis 6–3, 6–4
 It was Hingis' 12th title of the year and the 37th of her career. It was Novotná's 9th title of the year and the 102nd of her career.

References

External links
 
 Association of Tennis Professionals (ATP) tournament profile
 Women's Tennis Association (WTA) tournament profile

 
du Maurier Open
du Maurier Open
Canadian Open (tennis)
1998 in Canadian tennis